Mogwase is a town in Bojanala District Municipality in the North West province of South Africa.

Mogwase is close to Sun City and the Pilanesberg National Park, two of the major tourist attractions in the North West province, though the town itself has no significant attractions. Owing to the growth of the platinum industry, Mogwase is a fast-developing town.

See also
 Mogwase Stadium

References

Populated places in the Moses Kotane Local Municipality